Paulo Pancatuccio was a 16th-century cryptographer born in Volterra and employed by the Pope to break enciphered documents.

His activities are described in Blaise de Vigenère's book on cryptography.

Year of death missing
Year of birth missing
Pre-19th-century cryptographers